Simanta Shekhar (born 18 May 1982) is an Indian singer, composer and music producer from Assam he has been appointed by GOVT. of ASSAM as the new CHAIRMAN of ASSAM STATE FILM FINANCE AND DEVELOPMENT CORPORATION . Shekhar's music consists mainly of folk fusion and Indi-pop, and he is well-known for his Assamese single album songs. He had five consecutive hit songs in Assam, and his first recorded mainstream song,'Tora Doi', was a popular hit.

Early life
Simanta was born in Tihu, Nalbari, Assam to Daya Ram Barman and Arati Barman. From his school days he wanted to become a singer. He completed his H.S.L.C. at Tihu High school and completed his Bachelor of Pharmaceutical Science at Dibrugarh University. He started singing when he was in class one.

Career
Shekhar was featured in the famous track ‘Jhumoor’, in the fifth episode of Coke Studio (India) in 2013, alongside fellow singer Papon. He has also featured in a range of Assamese movies such as Pokhila. Much of Shekhar's music has proved to be successful and popular, including songs such as Gaanja Liya, Loi Ahisu Camera, Mur Babe, Degar Mari Mori Jam, Beauty Bettera, Jilele Jilele, and Deekha hei Khwaab (Fusion with Bihu).

Simanta has performed in concerts around the world, such as the annual two-day event held by the United Assam Association of the United Kingdom (UAAUK) as well as Sahaj Parab- the Bengali root music festival. He has also supported causes such as the First Direct Hair Implantation (DHI) clinic in Guwahati. 
His latest performance in the Sa Re Ga Ma Pa Bangla Grand Finale consisted of a fusion between Bihu and Bollywood, which attracted Bangla fans.

Discography

Album

Film soundtrack

Personal life

Simanta Shekhar married Preety Kongana. She is a former model and an very popular Assamese actress. They have a son, Kaavyik Shekhar, who is seven years old. Simanta resides in Guwahati.

References

Living people
Indian male singer-songwriters
Indian singer-songwriters
Assamese playback singers
People from Nalbari
1982 births
Indian male playback singers
Singers from Assam
Bharatiya Janata Party politicians from Assam
Dibrugarh University alumni